N-Phenylglycine is an organic compound with the formula C6H5NHCH2CO2H.  This white solid achieved fame as the industrial precursor to indigo dye.  It is a non-proteinogenic alpha amino acid related to sarcosine, but with an N-phenyl group in place of N-methyl.

Preparation
It is prepared by the Strecker reaction involving the reaction of formaldehyde, hydrogen cyanide, and aniline.  The resulting amino nitrile is hydrolyzed to give the carboxylic acid.

See also
 Phenylglycine, an isomer with the formula C6H5CH(NH2)CO2H.

References

Amino acids